This article presents a list of populated places in Curaçao. It is a constituent country of the Kingdom of the Netherlands. The island is divided in three districts. The current division dates from 1930.

 Bandabou - North-west
 Barber
 Lagún
 Sint Willibrordus
 Soto
 Tera Corá
 Westpunt
 Bandariba - South-east
 Oostpunt
 Santa Rosa
 Spaanse Water
 Willemstad - Capital city
 Brievengat
 Groot Kwartier (Emmastad)
 Groot Piscadera (Julianadorp)
 Hato
 Koraal Partir
 Otrobanda - historical quarter of Willemstad
 Pietermaai - historical quarter of Willemstad
 Piscadera Bay
 Saliña
 Scharloo - historical quarter of Willemstad
 Sint Michiel
 Steenrijk

References

 
Curaçao
Populated places